Settlement in a structure refers to the distortion or disruption of parts of a building due to
 unequal compression of its foundations;
 shrinkage, such as that which occurs in timber-framed buildings as the frame adjusts its moisture content; or
 undue loads being applied to the building after its initial construction.

Settlement should not be confused with subsidence which results from the load-bearing ground upon which a building sits reducing in level, for instance in areas of mine workings where shafts collapse underground.

Some settlement is quite normal after construction has been completed, but unequal or differential settlement may cause significant problems for buildings. Traditional green oak-framed buildings are designed to settle with time as the oak seasons and warps, lime mortar rather than Portland cement is used for its elastic properties and glazing will often employ small leaded lights which can accept movement more readily than larger panes.

See also
 Soil consolidation

References

Building defects
Structural engineering
Foundations (buildings and structures)